A bazaar or landa bazaar is a permanent marketplace or street of shops.

Bazaar may also refer to:

Places
 Bazaar, Kansas, an unincorporated community in the United States
 Namche Bazaar, Nepal
 De Bazaar Beverwijk Bazaar, Netherlands

Books
 "The Bazaar", short story and short story collection by Martin Armstrong 1924
"The Bazaar", short story and short story collection by Elizabeth Bowen

Film and TV
 Bazaar (1949 film), a 1949 Indian Hindi language family-drama film directed by K. Amarnath
 Bazaar (1982 film), a 1982 Indian film directed by Sagar Sarhadi
 Bazaar (2019 film), a 2019 Indian Kannada film by Suni

Music
 Bazaar (band), a Danish band
 Bazaar (album), a 2014 album by Wampire
 "The Bazaar", a 1995 song by The Tea Party

Brands
 GNU Bazaar, a software tool for distributed source code management
 Bazaar (supermarkets), a supermarket chain in Greece
 Bazaar, an open source software development model described in the essay The Cathedral and the Bazaar
 Harper's Bazaar, an American fashion magazine

See also 
 Bizarre (disambiguation)
 Bizaar, a 2000 album by Insane Clown Posse